Lee Butler may refer to:

 Lee Butler (footballer) (born 1966), English footballer
 Lee Pierce Butler (1884–1953), librarian at the University of Chicago
 George Lee Butler (born 1939), American military officer, last commander of Strategic Air Command